Ramón Coll Jaumet was a Costa Rican sports administrator and President of CONCACAF between 1961 and 1968.

In 1953, he wrote to the International Olympic Committee to request recognition of the Costa Rican Olympic Committee. The request was granted in May 1954.

On March 2 of 1967, the 1st Ordinary Congress of CONCACAF in Tegucigalpa, Honduras was held, under his presidency.

He was a member of the Executive Committee of CONCACAF between 1961 and 1974. He died in 1984. He is a member of the CONCACAF Hall of Fame.

References

Presidents of CONCACAF
Costa Rican sports executives and administrators
Association football executives
1984 deaths
Year of birth missing